Kipping is a German surname. Notable people with the surname include:

Frederic Stanley Kipping (1863−1949), English chemist
Herwig Kipping (born 1948), German film director
 (1695−1747), German jurist and professor
Katja Kipping (born 1978), German politician

German-language surnames